The Matra MS5 is a Formula Two and Formula Three racing car, designed, developed, and made by Matra, which was used in the Formula Two class of two World Championship Grands Prix in 1966 and 1967. It was actively used in motor racing competitions between 1965 and 1969. 

The MS5 was Matra's final Formula 3 car, based on the MS1 test car. The first two cars were ready just before the Formula 3 race in Monaco. A total of five MS5s were built in 1965, more followed and some remained in racing use until 1969.

The national races in France had absolute priority for Matra. In 1965 Jean-Pierre Beltoise won the French Formula 3 Championship ahead of his teammate Jean-Pierre Jaussaud. In 1966 Beltoise won the important Formula 3 race in Monaco with the MS5. In 1967 the works team dominated the Argentine championship and the two new works drivers Henri Pescarolo and Jean-Pierre Jabouille won the races in Monaco and Rouen. However, at the end of the season, the factory team was disbanded; French private teams bought the factory cars.

Matra managing director Jean-Luc Lagardère had already concluded an agreement with Ken Tyrrell in 1965 in order to enter Formula 2 with the British racing team owner. Tyrrell was given an MS5 with a BRM Formula 2 engine for trial purposes and from 1966 the team entered Formula 2 under the team name Matra International. The MS5 adapted to the regulations ran there under the type designation MS6.

The car made its World Championship Grand Prix debut at the 1966 German Grand Prix, being driven by Belgian Jacky Ickx, and was involved in an accident with John Taylor's Brabham BT11 during the race.

Formula One World Championship results
(key)(results in bold indicate pole position, results in italics indicate fastest lap)

Non-Championship Formula One results
(key)

References

Formula Two cars
Formula Three cars
Matra MS005